Lawrence Dundas may refer to:

Sir Lawrence Dundas, 1st Baronet (1710–1781)
Lawrence Dundas, 1st Earl of Zetland (1766–1839), British politician and nobleman
Lawrence Dundas, 1st Marquess of Zetland (1844–1929), British politician and statesman
Lawrence Dundas, 2nd Marquess of Zetland (1876–1961), British politician, also known as Lord Dundas and Earl of Ronaldshay
Lawrence Dundas, 3rd Marquess of Zetland (1908–1989), lawn tennis player known before 1971 as the Earl of Ronaldshay
Lawrence Mark Dundas, 4th Marquess of Zetland (born 1937), British nobleman